Nugent Island is the most northerly island in the Kermadec Islands and the most northerly part of New Zealand, being some 20 metres further to the North than nearby Napier Island. Nugent Island has a small island on the NW side with a narrow passage between. It is one of a group of islands to the north-east of Raoul Island. The island has never been modified by introduced mammals, and so has retained its original bird populations. It forms part of the Kermadec Islands Important Bird Area, identified as such by BirdLife International because it is an important site for nesting seabirds.

See also

 New Zealand outlying islands
 List of islands of New Zealand
 List of islands
 Desert island

References

Islands of the Kermadec Islands
Uninhabited islands of New Zealand
Important Bird Areas of the Kermadec Islands
Extreme points of New Zealand
Seabird colonies